Erigeron compositus is an Arctic and alpine species of fleabane in the family Asteraceae. Common names include dwarf mountain fleabane, cutleaf daisy, and trifid mountain fleabane.

Erigeron compositus has been found in the Russian Far East (Wrangel Island and Chukotka), Alaska, Greenland, much of Canada (all three Arctic territories plus British Columbia, all three Prairie Provinces, Quebec, Newfoundland, and Nova Scotia), and the Western United States (from the Pacific Coast as far east as the Dakotas, Colorado, and New Mexico).

The plant produces a taproot and spreads by means of horizontal underground rhizomes. There is generally only one flower head per stem, each head with 20–60 white, pink or blue ray florets; these are sometimes small and easily mistaken for disc florets. Genuine disc florets are yellow and in the center of the head.

References

External links

compositus
Flora of North America
Flora of Russia
Flora of Greenland
Plants described in 1813